Kūkaniloko Birth Site, also known as the Kūkaniloko Birthstones State Monument, is one of the most important ancient cultural sites on the island of Oahu. In 1973 it was first listed on the National Register of Historic Places and its boundaries were increased in 1995, after  of land which included the site became a state park in 1992. The site was the location for some of Hawaii's royal births. The Kukaniloko birth site may have served as astronomical function.

Geography
Kūkaniloko lies in the Wahiawā Plateau between Oahu's two mountain ranges: the Waianae to leeward, and the Koolau to windward. It also lies at the intersection of two major paths of overland travel: the Waialua Trail between the North Shore and ʻEwa Beach, and the Kolekole Trail through the Waianae Range.

The site is not only the piko of the island, but its placement across from the Waiʻanae Range could have been used as a calendar. The sun could be observed at Kūkaniloko by using certain markers.

The present day location is near the intersection of Kamehameha Highway and Whitmore Avenue just north of Wahiawā, Hawaii.

History
Kūkaniloko, meaning "to anchor the cry from within," is the geographic piko (navel) of Oahu. Kūkaniloko was symbolically the most powerful birth site for the island's high chiefs, among whom Kakuhihewa and Maʻilikākahi were perhaps most famous. At this site, women gave birth to aliʻi (royal) children, surrounded by ali'i witnesses. In the Kūkaniloko birthstone, when children are born they are required to learn the tradition and leaderships of their ancestors in the sites and surroundings.

The Hoolonopahu Heiau associated with the site was later destroyed, as were many others in the area, to make room for sugarcane and pineapple fields in the rich soils where sweet potato and yam once grew in abundance. Chiefly families lived along the slopes of the Waianae overlooking the plateau and along the shores of Waialua to the north, and many key battles between rivals for control of Oahu were also fought on the central plains surrounding Kūkaniloko.

In 1925, a group called the Daughters of Hawaii recognized and protected the Kukaniloko Birthstones site. In 1960, Kūkaniloko was passed to Hawaiian Civic Club of Wahiawa.

Births at the site 
From as early as 1100 until the mid-1600s, the father and 35 other chiefs would witness the birth of a chief at Kūkaniloko, which was announced by the playing of sacred drums. These 36 witnesses are symbolized by 36 stones in the complex. The newborn chief would then be taken to a nearby temple for purification, severing of the umbilical cord, and a reading of the newborn's genealogy.

Astronomical use 
The wide view of the skies from Kūkaniloko might also have made it a sort of Hawaiian Stonehenge. In April 2000, a team from the University of Hawaii Institute for Astronomy recorded designs and shapes on the stones that could have been used to track the movements of celestial objects for calendrical purposes.

Gallery

References

External links
 HCCW (Hawaiian Civic Club of Wahiawā Nonprofit) Kukaniloko Website: https://kukaniloko.weebly.com
 Barron, Kamira. Kukaniloko: A Living Legend
 Archived Official website

Heiau
State parks of Hawaii
Protected areas of Oahu
History of Oahu
Archaeological sites on the National Register of Historic Places in Hawaii
Archaeological sites in Hawaii
Buildings and structures in Honolulu County, Hawaii
Protected areas established in 1973
1973 establishments in Hawaii
National Register of Historic Places in Honolulu County, Hawaii